Konar Dun-e Olya (also Romanized as Konār Dūn-e ‘Olyā; also known as Konār Dūn) is a village in Margha Rural District, in the Central District of Izeh County, Khuzestan Province, Iran. At the 2006 census, its population was 75, in 12 families.

References 

Populated places in Izeh County